Subinvolution is a medical condition in which after childbirth, the uterus does not return to its normal size.

Presentation

Symptoms
The condition may be asymptomatic. The predominant symptoms are: 
 Abnormal lochial discharge either excessive or prolonged 
 Irregular or at times excessive uterine bleeding
 Irregular cramp like pain is cases of retained products or rise of temperature in sepsis

Signs
 The uterine height is greater than the normal for the particular day of puerperium. Normal puerperal uterus may be displaced by a full bladder or a loaded rectum. It feels boggy and softer upon palpation.
 Presence of features responsible for subinvolution may be evident.

Causes

Predisposing factors
 Grand multiparity
 Overdistension of uterus as in twins and hydramnios
 Ill maternal health
 Caesarean section 
 Uterine prolapse 
 Retroversion after the uterus becomes pelvic organ 
 Uterine fibroid

Aggravating factors
 Retained products of conception
 Uterine sepsis, endometritis

Factors
 Persistent lochia/fresh bleeding
 Long labor
 Anesthesia
 Full bladder
 Difficult delivery
 Retained placenta
 Maternal infection

Diagnosis

Definition
When the involution is impaired or retarded it is called subinvolution. The uterus is the most common organ affected by subinvolution. As it is the most accessible organ to be measured per abdomen, the uterine involution is considered clinically as an index to assess subinvolution.

Management
 Antibiotics in endometritis 
 Exploration of the uterus in retained products 
Pessary in prolapse or retroversion.
 Ergometrine so often prescribed to enhance the involution process by reducing the blood flow of the uterus is of no value in prophylaxis.

References
DC Dutta Textbook of obstetrics sixth edition

Obstetrics
Uterus